St Margaret, New Fish Street, was a parish church in the City of London.

The Mortality Bill for the year 1665, published by the Parish Clerks' Company, shows 97 parishes within the City of London. By September 6 the city lay in ruins, 86 churches having been destroyed. In 1670 a Rebuilding Act was passed and a committee set up under the stewardship of Sir Christopher Wren to decide which would be rebuilt. Fifty-one were chosen, but St Margaret New Fish Street where the Monument now stands in Bridge Ward was one of the minority never to be rebuilt. Variously called St Margaret Bridge Street and St Margaret Fish Street Hill, it received many gifts from the pilgrims who passed it on the way to and from London Bridge. Following the fire it was united to St Magnus-the-Martyr.

References

10th-century church buildings in England
1666 disestablishments in England
Churches destroyed in the Great Fire of London and not rebuilt
Churches in the City of London
Former buildings and structures in the City of London